Carlos Guerrico (28 April 1889 – 27 December 1958) was an Argentine fencer. He competed in the individual foil competition at the 1924 Summer Olympics.

References

External links
 

1889 births
1958 deaths
Argentine male fencers
Argentine foil fencers
Olympic fencers of Argentina
Fencers at the 1924 Summer Olympics
Fencers from Buenos Aires
20th-century Argentine people